The National Trans Visibility March is an annual march and rally that first took place in Washington D.C. on September 28, 2019 to call for federal recognition of transgender people and transgender rights in the United States. Activists called for Congress to pass the Equality Act, which would add gender identity to the Civil Rights Act. 

The first annual march was led by Marissa Miller and Luckie Alexander. Featured speakers included trans rights activist and actress Angelica Ross, trans rights activist Ashlee Marie Preston and Human Rights Campaign president Alphonso David. Over 5,600 people attended the march.

The 2020 march was held mostly online due to the COVID-19 pandemic. The 2021 march took place on October 9, 2021 in Orlando, Florida. The 2022 march took place on November 5, 2022 in West Hollywood, California.

See also
Equality Act (United States)
Trans March
Transgender rights in the United States

References

External links
 

LGBT civil rights demonstrations
Transgender events